Jareth McCready (born 6th July 1971 is a Northern Irish cricket umpire and match referee. In February 2022, he was elevated to Cricket Ireland's International Umpire Panel replacing Alan Neill. He stood in his first Twenty20 International (T20I), during the 2nd T20I match between Ireland and India on 28 June 2022.

See also
 List of Twenty20 International cricket umpires

References

1971 births
Living people
Irish Twenty20 International cricket umpires
Irish cricket people
Sportspeople from County Down